Ernest Pegg (July 1878 – 11 June 1916), commonly known as Dick Pegg, was an English footballer who played as a forward. Born in Leicester, he played for Leicester Fosse, Loughborough, Kettering Town, Reading, Preston North End, Manchester United, Fulham and Barnsley.

External links
MUFCInfo.com profile

1878 births
Footballers from Leicester
1916 deaths
English footballers
Leicester City F.C. players
Loughborough F.C. players
Kettering Town F.C. players
Reading F.C. players
Preston North End F.C. players
Manchester United F.C. players
Fulham F.C. players
Barnsley F.C. players
Association football forwards